Deh Nay (also Romanized as Deh Nāy) is a village in Bezenjan Rural District, in the Central District of Baft County, Kerman Province, Iran. At the 2006 census, its population was 157, in 35 families.

References 

Populated places in Baft County